Stobaera is a genus of delphacid planthoppers in the family Delphacidae. There are about 14 described species in Stobaera.

Species
These 14 species belong to the genus Stobaera:

References

Further reading

 
 
 
 
 
 
 
 
 
 
 
 
 
 
 
 

Auchenorrhyncha genera
Delphacini